Bonamargy is located in County Antrim, Northern Ireland, off the Cushendall Road on the approach to Ballycastle at the foot of the Margy River. The ruins of Bonamargy Friary are located here.

Geography of County Antrim